Cyclone Tracy is a 1986 Australian drama mini series about Cyclone Tracy. In 1986, the Nine Network and PBL created the mini-series based on the events during the cyclone. Michael Fisher, Ted Roberts and Leon Saunders wrote the series, and it starred Chris Haywood and Tracy Mann, who played the lead characters of Steve and Connie.  Tony Barry also featured amongst the cast.

Cast

 John Russell Waters as Narrator
 Chris Haywood as Steve Parry
 Nicholas Hammond as Harry Nelson
 Tracy Mann as Connie Hampton
 Linda Cropper as Joycie
 Tony Barry as Mick Brennan	
 Aileen Britton as Big Caroline
 Caroline Gillmer as Little Caroline
 Jack Webster as Bobbie
 Paul Pryor as Hilton
 Nicholas Papademetriou as Theo
 Noel Hodda as Tony
 Brendon Nolan as Army Officer
 Charito Ortez as Sandy Brennan
 Gerry Skilton as Wayne Churchill
 Stella Stefanidis as Mrs Kanderakis
 Roger Cox as Doc
 Johann Huang as Billy Hong
 Kate Ritchie as Molly
 Kendall Monaghan as Megan
 Lorraine Mafi-Williams as Alice Blue
 Graham Moore as Dreamboy
 Cecil Parkee as Benjamin
 David Slingsby as Hawthorne
 Saxon Cheng as Tom
 Creon Cheng as Jimmy
 Brian Roberts as Trevor Roberts
 Barry Langrish as Nugget
 Allan Penney as Ferret
 Sheb Wooley as Ben Miller
 Sinan Leong as Lindy Hong	
 Ray Chong as Mr Hong Snr.
 Ruth Chong as Mrs Hong Snr.
 Justin Lo as Bobby Hong
 Brendin Lo as Gavin Hong 	
 Robert Leong as Baby Hong
 Tony Blackett as Hastings
 Dan Holliday as Rook
 Lyndon Harris as Naval Operator
 David Downer as Mr. Renmark
 Susan Leith as Nurse Lyndoch
 Mary Regan as Sister Kingston
 Stan Penrose as Patient 1
 Peter Bellamy as Patient 2
 Susan Edmonds as Nurse 1
 Tasman Duffy as Injured Boy
 Ken Radley as Ambulanceman
 Alister Barnes as Man
 Myfanwy Morgan as Wife
 David Wilson as Sergeant
 Glen Keenan as Young Cop

Home media release
The mini-series was released on DVD by Umbrella Entertainment in December 2005. The DVD is compatible with all region codes and includes special features such as newsreel footage of the devastation and a documentary titled On A Wind And A Prayer.

References

External links
 Cyclone Tracy at Australian Screen Online
 

English-language television shows
1980s Australian television miniseries
1986 Australian television series debuts
1986 Australian television series endings
1986 television films
1986 films
Cyclone Tracy
Films directed by Kathy Mueller
Films directed by Donald Crombie